Wang Changguo (1880-1949) was a Chinese suffragist and feminist. She was a co-founder and leading member of the suffrage organisation Nüzi chanzheng tongmenghui (1912-1913).

References 

1880 births
1949 deaths
Chinese suffragists